Björn Gehlsen is a German lightweight rower. He won a gold medal at the 1989 World Rowing Championships in Bled with the lightweight men's quad scull.

References

Year of birth missing (living people)
Living people
German male rowers
World Rowing Championships medalists for West Germany